Thomas Grant Cretney (August 20, 1870 – April 16, 1938) was an American politician and businessman.

Born in the town of Ridgeway, Iowa County, Wisconsin, Cretney was a building contractor and President of the State Bank of Arena. Cretney was also in the real estate business and had invented and patented a system of traffic signs. Cretney served as president of the village of Ridgeway.  In 1915, Cretney served in the Wisconsin State Assembly as a Republican. He then moved to Madison, Wisconsin and served as sergeant at arms in the Wisconsin Assembly. Cretney died in Madison, Wisconsin after a long illness, leaving an estate valued at $13,500.

Notes

1870 births
1938 deaths
People from Ridgeway, Wisconsin
Businesspeople from Wisconsin
Mayors of places in Wisconsin
Republican Party members of the Wisconsin State Assembly
People from Madison, Wisconsin